Brötzmann is a German surname. Notable people with the surname include:

 Caspar Brötzmann (born 1962), German electric guitarist
 Peter Brötzmann (born 1941), German saxophonist and clarinetist
 Thorsten Brötzmann, German record producer, arranger and composer

German-language surnames